
Gmina Mszczonów is an urban-rural gmina (administrative district) in Żyrardów County, Masovian Voivodeship, in east-central Poland.

Villages
Apart from the town of Mszczonów, Gmina Mszczonów contains the villages and settlements of Adamówek, Adamowice, Badów Górny, Badowo-Dańki, Badowo-Mściska, Bobrowce, Bronisławów, Bronisławów Osuchowski, Budy-Strzyże, Budy-Zasłona, Chudolipie, Ciemno-Gnojna, Czekaj, Dębiny Osuchowskie, Długowizna, Dwórzno, Edwardowo, Gąba, Grabce Józefpolskie, Grabce Wręckie, Grabce-Towarzystwo, Huta Piekarska, Janówek, Kaczków, Kamionka, Kowiesowo, Kowiesy, Lindów, Lublinów, Lutkówka, Lutkówka Druga, Lutkówka-Kolonia, Małachowszczyzna, Marianka, Marków-Świnice, Marków-Towarzystwo, Michalin, Nosy-Poniatki, Nowe Poręby, Nowy Dworek, Olszewek, Olszówka, Osuchów, Osuchów-Kolonia, Pawłowice, Piekarowo, Piekary, Pieńki Osuchowskie, Pieńki-Strzyże, Podlindowo, Pogorzałki, Powązki, Sosnowica, Strzyże, Suszeniec, Świnice, Tłumy, Władysławów, Wólka Wręcka, Wręcza, Wygnanka, Wymysłów, Zbiroża, Zimna Woda and Zimnice.

Neighbouring gminas
Gmina Mszczonów is bordered by the gminas of Biała Rawska, Błędów, Kowiesy, Pniewy, Puszcza Mariańska, Radziejowice and Żabia Wola.

References
Polish official population figures 2006

Mszczonow
Żyrardów County